McNeil High School (commonly known as MHS or McNeil) is a public secondary school in an unincorporated area in both Travis and Williamson counties, near Austin, Texas, United States. Serving freshmen, sophomores, juniors, and seniors. The school is part of the Round Rock Independent School District (RRISD), with admission primarily based on the locations of students' homes in the district. Four middle schools feed into McNeil: Cedar Valley, Chisholm Trail, Pearson Ranch and Deerpark. The school colors are navy blue, forest green, and white, and the mascot is the Maverick.

McNeil is Designated as a 6A school under the University Interscholastic League (UIL)

McNeil is located on the border of Williamson and Travis County, with part of the school in one county and the rest in another.

The school serves: the census-designated place of Jollyville, and sections of the Brushy Creek CDP. The U.S. Census Bureau, prior to 2010, defined the Jollyville CDP as including a portion of the school area.

Academic awards
McNeil was named a National Blue Ribbon School in 1999-2000. Children at Risk ranked McNeil the #10 public high school in Austin in 2012. The high school was also recognized as a PLTW Distinguished School in 2019, one of just 133 high schools in the United States.

Athletics

Boys
Tennis, Cross Country, Swimming, Club Lacrosse, Basketball, Soccer, Track & Field, Golf, Baseball, Football, Powerlifting, Hockey, and Wrestling.

Girls
Tennis, Cross Country, Swimming, Club Lacrosse, Basketball, Soccer, Track & Field, Golf, Softball, Cheerleading, Volleyball and Wrestling.

Notable alumni

 A. J. Abrams, professional basketball player
 Armoni Brooks, NBA player
 Scott Linebrink, MLB player
 Aaron Williams, NFL player
James Talarico, Texas House Member

References

External links
 McNeil Web Site
 District Homepage

Round Rock Independent School District
High schools in Williamson County, Texas
High schools in Travis County, Texas
Public high schools in Texas